Koh-e-Murad  (Balochi and ) is a shrine located near the town of Turbat in the Baluchistan province of Pakistan. This location is a site of ziyarat for Zikris. Zikris believe that their Mahdi spent the last years of his life at this site praying and preaching his faith. Religious Zikris make a yearly pilgrimage to Koh-e-Murad on the 27th of Ramadan.

References 

Balochistan